Georges Vallerey Jr. (21 October 1927 – 4 October 1954) was a French swimmer, born in Amiens, who competed in the 1948 Summer Olympics.

References

1927 births
1954 deaths
Sportspeople from Amiens
French male freestyle swimmers
French male backstroke swimmers
Olympic swimmers of France
Swimmers at the 1948 Summer Olympics
Olympic bronze medalists for France
Olympic bronze medalists in swimming
European Aquatics Championships medalists in swimming
Medalists at the 1948 Summer Olympics